Stephen Mark Wookey (born 2 September 1954) is an English vicar who played first-class cricket for Cambridge University and Oxford University.

Stephen Wookey was educated at Malvern College, where he played cricket for the First XI. He went up to Emmanuel College, Cambridge, playing for the university team and winning his Blue in 1975 and 1976. He then went to the theological college Wycliffe Hall, Oxford, to study for the Anglican ministry. He won his Blue at Oxford in 1978, which was his most successful season, with 11 wickets at 39.18, including three wickets in an innings on three occasions and the dismissal of Geoffrey Boycott, caught and bowled for a duck. He was only the second person, after David Jarrett, to win cricket Blues at both Cambridge and Oxford. He also played a few matches for Wiltshire in the Minor Counties Championship between 1974 and 1978.

He was ordained in the Church of England in 1981. He served at Christ Church in Cockfosters, London; St Michael's Church in Paris; All Souls Church, Langham Place, London; and he has been vicar at St David's Church, Moreton-in-Marsh, since 1996. He is married, with three children. He wrote the book When a Church Becomes a Cult: The Masks of a New Religious Movement in 1996.

References

External links
 Stephen Wookey at Cricinfo
 Stephen Wookey at CricketArchive
 "Chasing After the Wind" – a sermon by Steve Wookey on YouTube

1954 births
Living people
People from Wiltshire
People educated at Malvern College
Alumni of Emmanuel College, Cambridge
Alumni of Wycliffe Hall, Oxford
English cricketers
Cambridge University cricketers
Oxford University cricketers
Wiltshire cricketers
20th-century English Anglican priests
21st-century English Anglican priests
People from Moreton-in-Marsh